A Dinner for Them to Meet is a 2007 Italian comedy film directed by Pupi Avati.

Premise
After Sandro Lanza, an aging television soap opera television star, suffers through an embarrassing televised media event, he attempts suicide. This brings his three daughters, Clara, Betty and Ines, the children of three different wives, to his home in Rome, where they meet each other for the first time.

Cast 
Diego Abatantuono: Sandro Lanza
Vanessa Incontrada: Clara Lanza
Violante Placido: Elisabetta "Betty" Lanza
Inés Sastre: Ines Lanza
Francesca Neri: Alma Kero
Gianfranco Barra: Corrado
Fabio Ferrari: Matteo
Blas Roca Rey: Federico

References

External links

2007 films
Italian comedy films
Films directed by Pupi Avati
2007 comedy films
Films scored by Riz Ortolani